Sor Citroën, or Sor Citroen, is a 1967 Spanish comedy film directed by Pedro Lazaga and starring Gracita Morales as Sister Tomasa, a nun who drives a Citroën 2CV.

Plot
A community of nuns who run an orphanage for girls decides to get motorized and they buy a Citroën 2CV. Sister Tomasa, an impulsive and outgoing nun who has just arrived to the community, is the one to learn to drive. At first she is not very good at it, jeopardizing traffic on several occasions, so she is nicknamed "Sor Citroën" ("Sister Citroën"). When she finally gets the driving license, she dedicates together with Sister Rafaela to drive through the streets of Madrid asking for charity for the orphanage.

Cast
 Gracita Morales as Sister Tomasa / Sor Citroën
 José Luis López Vázquez as "El Cuchillas"
 Rafaela Aparicio as Sister Rafaela
 Juanjo Menéndez as Father Jerónimo
  as Superior Mother
 Rafael Alonso as driving examiner
  as Tomasa's Father
 Antonio Ferrandis as Don Paco, the Police commissioner
 José Sacristán as street vendor
 Jesús Guzmán as street vendor
 Margot Cottens as "La Trini"

Production

Censorship
The film had to deal during production with Francoist film censors. A scene that was showing the nuns having soup in the refectory while one of them recites the traffic laws was cut off as inappropriate.

Legacy

In popular culture
The Citroën 2CV is usually listed as one of the most iconic cars in the history of Spanish cinema for its role in this film.

References

External links
 
 

Films directed by Pedro Lazaga
Spanish comedy films
Films scored by Antón García Abril